Acuba Film is an Estonian film production company.

The company is founded in 1998 by Arko Okk and Jaan Tätte.

Filmography
 "Ristumine peateega" (1999)
 "Intiimne linn" (2003, documentary film)
 "Buss" (2004, documentary film)
 "Mees animatsioonist" (2005, documentary film)
 "Koer, lennuk ja laulupidu" (2006)
 "Seal, kus lõpeb luule" (2009, documentary film)
 "Monoloogid 3D" (2011, documentary film)
 "Lootus 3D" (2011, short film)
 "Lisa, Go Home" (2012, documentary film)
 "Allan" (2014, documentary film)
 "Hei, Rasma!" (2015, documentary film)
 "Jüri!" (2015, documentary film)

References

Film production companies of Estonia